Jacinto is a Brazilian municipality located in the northeast of the state of Minas Gerais. Jacinto is located on the right bank of the Jequitinhonha River.  It is 44 kilometers east of Almenara.

The legend tells that the city name is a homage to an old settler named Jacinto who lived in the city around the 1910s.

See also
 List of municipalities in Minas Gerais

References

External links
Frigoletto

Municipalities in Minas Gerais
Populated places established in 1943